The Calmar Passenger Depot is a historic building located in Calmar, Iowa, United States.  It was built by the Chicago, Milwaukee & St. Paul Railroad in 1915 to replace the Depot Hotel that had been destroyed in a fire.  The single-story building originally featured a  canopy on its east side that was removed by the railroad in 1970.  It was reconstructed in 1998.  The passenger trains were on a line that ran between Madison, Wisconsin and South Dakota.  They were discontinued in the 1960s.  The former depot now houses restrooms for the Prairie Farmer Bike trail, which is adjacent to the building, farmers and flea markets, and other small community events. It was listed on the National Register of Historic Places in 2011.

References 

Railway stations in the United States opened in 1915
Former Chicago, Milwaukee, St. Paul and Pacific Railroad stations
Former railway stations in Iowa
Neoclassical architecture in Iowa
Railway stations on the National Register of Historic Places in Iowa
National Register of Historic Places in Winneshiek County, Iowa
Transportation buildings and structures in Winneshiek County, Iowa